Admiral Kuznetsov Strait is a 50 km-wide strait in Russia. It separates Medny Island and Bering Island of the Commander Islands and connects the Bering Sea in the north with the Pacific Ocean in the south. Named in honor of Admiral Nikolay Kuznetsov.

Straits of Russia
Straits of the Pacific Ocean
Bodies of water of Kamchatka Krai
Bodies of water of the Bering Sea
Commander Islands
Pacific Coast of Russia